Best Kept Secret is a 2013 American documentary film that was directed by Samantha Buck and produced by Danielle DiGiacomo. The film aired as part of POV on PBS and focuses on a special education teacher who must find her students a place in the real world as they prepare to leave the public school system.

Synopsis

The documentary follows one of the classes attending JFK High School in Newark, New Jersey, as they prepare for graduation. In a year and a half they will graduate from the public school system and go on to their next stage of life. What makes Janet Mino's class different from some others is that she teaches special needs students and some might find it difficult to move on to things that others without disabilities would find easier to accomplish.

Production
During filming Buck received no interference from the principal of the high school and found the school and its staff very accommodating. She chose to use the class's teacher, Mino, as the documentary's storytelling vehicle, as they viewed her as "the thread that pulled all of those stories together". She and DiGiacomo also felt that "The best way to get people to care about a social issue that they might not have a personal relationship with is to get them to be emotionally involved and to care about people so by telling a story where, hopefully, you care deeply about Mino and her amazing experience — she's so expressive and the guys have good personalities and you care about them — I felt like that was the best way to get people emotionally connected."

Best Kept Secret was executive produced by Paul Bernon, Sean Curran, Daniella Kahane, and Scott Mosier.

Reception

Critical reception for Best Kept Secret has been overwhelmingly positive and the movie holds a rating of 100 on both Rotten Tomatoes (based on 11 reviews) and Metacritic (based on 4 reviews). It was a New York Times Critics Pick. Variety praised the documentary for focusing on minority groups with disabilities such as autism as opposed to "white, middle-class children" and the contrast in the options available to the minority groups. The Los Angeles Times commented that the movie "unfolds with limited on-screen explanatory text and no expert talking heads, inserting the viewer into the overwhelming experience of teaching, parenting, even being an underprivileged young adult with autism." Best Kept Secret was one of five nominees for the Gotham Independent Film Audience Award and the winner of a 2013 Peabody Award.

References

External links
 
 
 
 

2013 films
2013 documentary films
Documentary films about autism
Documentary films about special education
POV (TV series) films
Films shot in New Jersey
Special education in the United States
Education in Essex County, New Jersey
2010s English-language films
2010s American films